Žaneta Jaunzeme-Grende (born 10 March 1964) is a Latvian politician and businesswoman. She is a member of the National Alliance, and former Minister for Culture in the Third Dombrovskis cabinet. She was President of the Latvian Chamber of Commerce from 2008 to 2011.

On September 16, 2013 Jaunzeme-Grende was fired from the position of Minister for Culture of Latvia by the Prime Minister Valdis Dombrovskis because of her conflict with the culture sector, She was subsequently replaced by Dace Melbārde.

She speaks Latvian, English, and Russian.

Footnotes

1964 births
Living people
Politicians from Riga
All for Latvia! politicians
National Alliance (Latvia) politicians
Ministers of Culture of Latvia
Businesspeople from Riga
Women government ministers of Latvia
Latvian women in business
University of Latvia alumni
Latvian Academy of Sport Education alumni

21st-century Latvian women politicians